Boma Goodhead, born 24 November 1970, is a Nigerian politician and federal lawmaker representing Asari-Toru Federal Constituency in Rivers State. She is a member of the Peoples Democratic Party.

Early life and education 
Boma was born on 24 November 1970 to Melford Dokubo, a former high court judge in Nigeria. She is from Buguma in Asari-Toru local government area of Rivers State. She is the younger sister to Asari Dokubo.

Controversy 
During a committee meeting in 2017 she allegedly threatened to “break the head” of fellow lawmaker, Razak Atunwa who had written a letter to then President Goodluck Jonathan, asking him to appear before an ad hoc panel for a bribery scandal.

References 

Living people
1970 births
University of Port Harcourt alumni
Nigerian politicians
Nigerian women in politics